Poecilosomella is a genus of flies belonging to the family Lesser Dung flies. These small flies, often with attractive patterning on the wings and body, are commonly found in a wide range of habitats throughout the Old World and Australasia.

Species
P. aciculata (Deeming, 1969)
P. additionalis Papp, 2010
P. affinis Hayashi, 2002
P. albipes (Duda, 1925)
P. amputata (Duda, 1925)
P. angulata (Thomson, 1869)
P. annulitibia (Deeming, 1969)
P. arnaudi Papp, 1990
P. biseta Dong, Yang & Hayashi, 2006
P. borboroides (Walker, 1860)
P. borborus Papp, 2002
P. brevisecunda Papp, 2002
P. brunettii (Deeming, 1969)
P. capensis Papp, 1990
P. conspicua Papp, 2002
P. cryptica Papp, 1991
P. curvipes Papp, 2002
P. duploseriata Papp, 2010
P. formosana Papp, 2002
P. furcata (Duda, 1925)
P. guangdongensis Dong, Yang & Hayashi, 2006
P. hayashii Papp, 2002
P. himalayensis (Deeming, 1969)
P. hyalipennis Hackman, 1965
P. insularis Hayashi, 1997
P. kittenbergeri Papp, 2010
P. longecostata (Duda, 1925)
P. longicalcar Papp, 2002
P. longichaeta Dong, Yang & Hayashi, 2007
P. longinervis (Duda, 1925)
P. lusingana (Vanschuytbroeck, 1959)
P. maxima (Vanschuytbroeck, 1950)
P. meijerei (Duda, 1925)
P. mirabilis Vanschuytbroeck, 1951
P. multicolor (Richards, 1968)
P. multipunctata (Duda, 1925)
P. nepalensis (Deeming, 1969)
P. nigra Papp, 2002
P. nigrotibiata (Duda, 1925)
P. occulta Papp, 2010
P. pallidimana (Duda, 1925)
P. pappi Hayashi, 1997
P. paraciculata Papp, 2002
P. paracryptica Papp, 2002
P. parangulata Papp, 2010
P. pectiniterga (Deeming, 1964)
P. peniculifera Papp, 2002
P. perinetica (Hackman, 1967)
P. pictitarsis (Richards, 1938)
P. pilimana Papp, 2002
P. pilipino Papp, 2002
P. punctipennis (Wiedemann, 1824)
P. rectinervis (Duda, 1925)
P. ronkayi Papp, 2002
P. sabahi Papp, 2002
P. setimanus Papp, 2010
P. setosissima Papp, 2010
P. spinicauda Papp, 2002
P. spinipes Papp, 2002
P. subpilimana Papp, 2002
P. tridens Dong, Yang & Hayashi, 2007
P. varians (Duda, 1925)

References

Sphaeroceridae
Diptera of Europe
Diptera of Africa
Diptera of Asia
Diptera of Australasia
Taxa named by Oswald Duda
Brachycera genera